Akko rossi, the blackfin specter goby, is a species of goby from the family Gobiidae. It is mostly known from one specimen from El Salvador. It lives in burrows in black mud.

References

rossi
Fish described in 2004